The National Assessment and Accreditation Council (NAAC) is a government organisation in India that assesses and accredits Higher Education Institutions (HEIs). It is an autonomous body funded by the University Grants Commission and headquartered in Bangalore.

History
NAAC was established in 1994 in response to recommendations of National Policy in Education (1986). This policy was to "address the issues of deterioration in quality of education", and the Programme of Action (POA-1992) laid out strategic plans for the policies including the establishment of an independent national accreditation body. Consequently, the NAAC was established in 1994 with its headquarters at Bengaluru.

Grading
NAAC grades institutes on an eight-grade ladder:

Accreditations
, 655 universities and 13316 colleges were accredited by NAAC.

Results 
NAAC published a consolidated list of higher education institutions with valid accreditation as of 11 March 2020. The outcome of the recent cycles of accreditation process is tabulated below.

References

External links
 

1994 establishments in Karnataka
College accreditors in India
Councils
Government agencies established in 1994
Executive branch of the government of India
Organisations based in Bangalore